Solomon Islands is an island country in the South Pacific Ocean, that lies east of Papua New Guinea.

Islands 

The major part of the nation of Solomon Islands is the mountainous high islands of the Solomon Islands (archipelago), which includes Choiseul, the Shortland Islands, the New Georgia Islands, Santa Isabel, the Russell Islands, the Florida Islands, Tulagi, Malaita, Maramasike, Ulawa, Owaraha (Santa Ana), Makira (San Cristobal), and the main island of Guadalcanal. (The largest island in the archipelago is Bougainville, but it is politically an autonomous region of the neighbouring country of Papua New Guinea.) Solomon Islands also includes isolated low-lying atolls and high islands such as Sikaiana, Rennell Island, Bellona Island, the Santa Cruz Islands and the remote, tiny outliers, Tikopia, Anuta, and Fatutaka.

Geology and ecology 

Volcanoes with varying degrees of activity are situated on some of the larger islands, while many of the smaller islands are simply tiny atolls covered in sand and palm trees.

The baseline survey of marine biodiversity in the Solomon Islands that was carried out in 2004, found 474 species of corals in the Solomons as well as nine species which could be new to science. This is the second highest diversity of corals in the World, second only to the Raja Ampat Islands in eastern Indonesia.

Climate

The climate is tropical, though temperatures are rarely extreme due to cooling winds blowing off the surrounding seas. Daytime temperatures are normally 25 to 32 °C (77 to 90 °F). From April to October (the dry season), the southeast trade winds blow, gusting at times up to 30 knots (55 km/h) or more.

November to March is the wet season—the northwest monsoon—typically warmer and wetter. Cyclones arise in the Coral Sea and the area of the Solomon Islands, but they usually veer toward Vanuatu and New Caledonia or down the coast of Australia.

Climate data

Statistics 

Geographic coordinates: 

Area:
total:
28,896 km² (10,985 mi²)
land:
27,986 km² (10,633 mi²)
water:
910 km² (351 mi²)

Coastline: 5,313 km

Maritime claims:
Measured from claimed archipelagic baselines
continental shelf:  

exclusive economic zone:  
 (200 nmi)
territorial sea:   

Terrain: Mostly rugged mountains with some low coral atolls

Elevation extremes:
lowest point:
Pacific Ocean 0 m
highest point:
Mount Popomanaseu 2,332 m (7,651 ft) (not Mount Makarakomburu)

Natural resources: fish, forests, gold, bauxite, phosphates, lead, zinc, nickel

Land use:
arable land:
0.62%
permanent crops:
2.04%
other:
97.34% (2005)

Irrigated land: NA

Natural hazards: Typhoons, but they are rarely destructive; geologically active region with frequent earth tremors; volcanic activity

Environment – current issues: Deforestation; soil erosion; much of the surrounding coral reefs are dead or dying

Environment – international agreements:
party to: Biodiversity, Climate Change, Climate Change-Kyoto Protocol, Desertification, Environmental Modification, Law of the Sea, Marine Dumping, Marine Life Conservation, Ozone Layer Protection, Whaling

Extreme points
This is a list of the extreme points of Solomon Islands, the points that are farther north, south, east or west than any other location.

 Northernmost point – Ontong Java Atoll, Malaita Province
 Easternmost point – Fatutaka, Santa Cruz Islands, Temotu Province
 Southernmost point – South Reef, Indispensable Reef, Rennell and Bellona Province
 Westernmost point – Mono Island, Treasury Islands, Western Province

See also
 List of mammals of the Solomon Islands archipelago
 Provinces of Solomon Islands

References